The 2016 Euro RX of Barcelona was the seventh round of the forty-first season of the FIA European Rallycross Championship. The event was held at the Circuit de Barcelona-Catalunya in Montmeló, Barcelona as an undercard to the 2016 World RX of Barcelona and was contested by the Supercar (fourth round) and Super1600 (fifth round) classes.

Supercar

Heats

Semi-finals
Semi-Final 1

Semi-Final 2

Final

Standings after the event

Supercar standings

Super1600 standings

 Note: Only the top five positions are included for both sets of standings.

References

|- style="text-align:center"
|width="35%"|Previous race:2016 Euro RX of France
|width="35%"|FIA European RallycrossChampionship2016 season
|width="35%"|Next race:2016 Euro RX of Latvia

Barcelona
Euro RX, Barcelona